Borough status is granted by royal charter to local government districts in England, Wales and Northern Ireland. The status is purely honorary, and does not give any additional powers to the council or inhabitants of the district. In Scotland, similarly chartered communities were known as royal burghs, although the status is no longer granted.

Origins of borough status

Until the local government reforms of 1973 and 1974, boroughs were towns possessing charters of incorporation conferring considerable powers, and were governed by a municipal corporation headed by a mayor. The corporations had been reformed by legislation beginning in 1835 (1840 in Ireland). By the time of their abolition there were three types:
County boroughs
Municipal or non-county boroughs
Rural boroughs

Many of the older boroughs could trace their origin to medieval charters or were boroughs by prescription, with Saxon origins. Most of the boroughs created after 1835 were new industrial, resort or suburban towns that had grown up after the industrial revolution. Borough corporations could also have the status of a city.

For pre-1974 boroughs, see Municipal Corporations Act 1835, Boroughs incorporated in England and Wales 1835–1882, Unreformed boroughs in England and Wales 1835–1886, Boroughs incorporated in England and Wales 1882–1974, Municipal Corporations (Ireland) Act 1840

Modern borough status

England and Wales
Borough status no longer implies a town or urban area.  Outside Greater London, borough status is granted to metropolitan and non-metropolitan districts under the provisions of section 245 of the Local Government Act 1972. This section allows the council of a district to petition the monarch for a charter granting borough status. The resolution must have the support of at least two-thirds of the councillors. Having received the petition the monarch may, on the advice of the Privy Council, grant a charter whereupon:
The district becomes a borough
The district council becomes the borough council
The chairman and vice-chairman become entitled to the style mayor and deputy mayor of the borough, except in councils that have an elected mayor under the Local Government Act 2000.

Charters granted under the 1972 Act may allow the borough council to appoint "local officers of dignity" previously appointed by an abolished borough corporation. Examples include:
Honorary recorder: some borough and city councils have the right to appoint a circuit judge or recorder appointed under the Courts Act 1971 as honorary recorder. Usually this is the senior judge in the council's area.
Sheriff: These are appointed in a number of boroughs and cities that were formerly counties corporate.
High steward: originally a judicial office, often held by a peer, now entirely ceremonial.

There is no obligation on the council to appoint persons to these positions.

In some boroughs the mayor has the additional title as "Admiral of the Port", recalling an historic jurisdiction. The lord mayors of Chester and Kingston-upon-Hull are admirals of the Dee and the Humber respectively, the Mayor of Medway is Admiral of the River Medway, and the mayors of Poole and Southampton are admirals of those ports.
  
Privileges or rights belonging to citizens or burgesses of a former borough can be transferred to the inhabitants of the new borough.

Borough councils are permitted to pass a resolution admitting "persons of distinction" and persons who have "rendered eminent service" to be an honorary freeman of the borough. This power has been used to grant honorary freedom not only to individuals, but to units and ships of the armed forces.

England
Borough charters granted under section 245 of the Local Government Act 1972 to metropolitan and non-metropolitan districts of England 

Greater London is divided into thirty-two London boroughs. Their borough status dates from 1965, although each of them had previously included municipal, county or metropolitan boroughs:

Wales
Borough charters granted under section 245 of the Local Government Act 1972 to Welsh districts

The districts created in 1974 were abolished in 1996 by the Local Government (Wales) Act 1994. The 1994 Act amended section 245 of the Local Government Act 1972, allowing for the new unitary county councils established by the Act to apply for a charter in a similar manner to the old district councils. On receiving a charter a county became a "county borough".

Welsh unitary authorities granted a charter in 1996 bestowing county borough status

Northern Ireland
The privileges of borough status are that the council chairperson is called "mayor" and up to one quarter of councillors can be called "alderman", and the council can award freedom of the borough. The Municipal Corporations (Ireland) Act 1840 extinguished all the boroughs in Ireland except for ten. In what would in 1921 become Northern Ireland, there were two remaining municipal boroughs in 1840: Belfast (made a city in 1888) and Derry (officially Londonderry, and a city since 1604). Five towns with abolished corporations remained parliamentary boroughs until 1885 (Armagh, Carrickfergus, Coleraine, Dungannon, and Enniskillen) as did three (Downpatrick, Lisburn, and Newry) where any corporation was defunct by 1801. Several of the urban districts in Northern Ireland created under the Local Government (Ireland) Act 1898 later received charters granting borough status. The Local Government Act (Northern Ireland) 1972 replaced the multi-tier local government system with 26 unitary districts whose councils could retain the charter of a borough within the district; other districts later received borough charters in their own right. The 2015 local government reforms replaced the 26 districts with 11 larger districts. The "statutory transition committee" handling each council merger had the right to request transfer of borough status as in 1972, and unionist-majority councils did so, while nationalist-majority councils chose not to apply. There were complications where places had city status; therefore Belfast, Derry and Lisburn's borough charters carried over automatically, without the need for the council to pass a resolution. Although Newry received city status in 2002, Newry and Mourne District Council did not receive borough status. In 2015 its successor Newry, Mourne and Down District Council voted not to request borough status, the required two-thirds majority failing after opposition from Sinn Féin.

See also
City status in the United Kingdom

References

Citations

Sources 

 
 Local Government Act 1972
 Local Government (Wales) Act 1994
 Whitaker's Almanac 1975, 1986, 1995 editions
 Local Government in England and Wales : A guide to the New System, HMSO, London 1974

External links
Text of charter granted to Charnwood, 15 May 1974
Charters of Hereford
Minutes of Privy Councilheld on 14 March 2001, where approval was given for the grant of a charter to Telford and the Wrekin
Text of charter granted to West Devon, 26 April 1982

 
Types of subdivision in the United Kingdom